Syrnolopsis minuta is a species of medium-sized freshwater snail with an operculum, an aquatic gastropod mollusks in the family Paludomidae. This species is found around the edges of Lake Tanganyika, which includes the countries of Burundi, the Democratic Republic of the Congo, Tanzania, and Zambia. The natural habitat of this species is intermittent freshwater lakes.

References

Paludomidae
Gastropods described in 1885
Taxonomy articles created by Polbot